The UK India Business Council (UKIBC) is a membership-based, non-profit organisation founded in 2007 to foster trade and business relations between the United Kingdom and India. The organisation works with businesses in both countries, as well as the UK and Indian governments, to promote and increase bilateral trade. The UK India Business Council supports UK businesses with the insights, networks, policy advocacy, services, and facilities needed to succeed in India.

Working with the UK Government and other influential and connected partners, they ensure business interests are conveyed to India’s Union and State legislators. 

For those seeking practical advice, their team provides a range of sector-specific research, market entry and expansion services that help businesses understand – and take – the opportunities.

Through a wide variety of events and member-only Sector Policy Groups, they enable businesspeople to meet each other, identify potential partners, suppliers and customers, and to learn from top business leaders and commentators, including those on the Advisory Council.

UKIBC is a sister organisation to the UK-ASEAN Business Council

The UK India Business Council is the sole accredited UK Government Overseas Business Network Initiative provider for India. UKIBC is accredited by British Chambers of Commerce and works in partnership with UK Trade & Investment.

History
UKIBC has its origins in the Indo British Partnership (IBP) initiative, signed by then Prime Ministers John Major and P. V. Narasimha Rao in 1993. In 2005 this evolved into a private limited company called the 'Indo British Partnership Network (IBPN). With the UKIBC receiving increased investment in 2007 from UK Trade & Investment under direction from then UK Chancellor Gordon Brown, Sharon Bamford was appointed CEO to oversee the transition of the organisation.

The Rt Hon Patricia Hewitt has been Chair of the UK India Business Council since 2009. Lord Karan Bilimoria, is the founding Chairman of the UK-India Business Council.
Lord Mervyn Davies served as the Chair of UK India Business Council in July 2017 until June 2020. Since, Richard Heald, OBE has taken up the position, stepping up from his role as CEO since 2010.

Organisation and Leadership

In 2010, Richard Heald, former Vice-President of the Indian arm of N M Rothschild & Sons was appointed the new CEO of the organisation.

Jayant Krishna, Tata Group veteran and former CEO of the National Skill Development Corporation, was appointed as Group CEO of UKIBC in 2020.

UKIBC currently deals with ten major sectors, namely:

 Advanced Engineering and Manufacturing
 Digital Innovation
 Energy
 Food and Drink
 Financial, Legal and Professional Services
 Infrastructure
 Life Sciences and Healthcare
 Retail, Lifestyle and Logistics
 Skills and Education
 Sports

Facilities

Market Entry
UKIBC provides sector-specific research and market entry-related services to help British companies understand the opportunities and make informed choices about their investment. Additionally, UKIBC supports UK SME's to help and expand into the Indian market, through incubation support, which de-risks the market entry process by its service called Launchpad. UK SME's may also reach out to UKIBC for legal business set-up advisory support and services.

Food and Drink, Retail and E-Commerce
UKIBC is mandated by HMG's Department of International Trade to assist in day to day events to include Policy, Market Access, Advocacy, and Trade Promotion for the F&D, Retail, and E-Com sector.

Strategic partners
The UKIBC is partnered with major following companies - 
 UK Trade & Investment
 Standard Chartered
 PricewaterhouseCoopers
 Barclays
 British Airways
 BT
 Cipla
 Dell
 Diageo
 HSBC
 Tata
 AgustaWestland

See also
 British Business Groups (BBG)

References

External links 
 Official website of UKIBC
 UKIBC India

Others
 UKIBC introduces a new market entry service 'Launchpad'
 Maharashtra  govt inks MoU on ‘ease of doing biz’ with UKIBC
 UK set to invest millions in CSR in India Economic Times, 2013

Foreign trade of the United Kingdom
Business organisations based in the United Kingdom
Foreign trade of India
India–United Kingdom relations
2007 establishments in the United Kingdom
Organizations established in 2007
International nongovernmental organizations